Hannah Mary Barnes (born 4 May 1993) is a British racing cyclist, who rides for UCI Women's WorldTeam .

Career
Born in Tunbridge Wells, Kent, Barnes grew up in Bladon, Oxfordshire and later moved to Towcester, Northamptonshire. Barnes began cycling with Milton Keynes based Team Keyne at the age of 10, before joining Palmer Park Velo in Reading after she was spotted and invited to join British Cycling's Talent Team. Barnes was the under 14 omnium National Champion, a title held the previous year by Laura Trott, and the following year by Lucy Garner. A handful of national titles followed as an under 16 rider on the track, and again as a junior, when she also added the junior British National Time Trial Championships to her palmarès. As a junior rider, she also won the senior women's British National Circuit Race Championships in 2010 and 2011.

Barnes represented England at the 2011 Commonwealth Youth Games, held on the Isle of Man. In 2012, she rode for the UCI Women's Team Team Ibis Cycles.

On 8 June 2013, Barnes won the Elite Women's Criterium at the 7th edition of the IG London Nocturne. Originally she had been demoted to second place, behind Laura Trott, for her victory celebration which was deemed to be dangerous riding, but this decision was later reversed.

In November 2013 it was announced that Barnes would be racing for the new  women's cycling team in 2014. In November 2015 she was announced as part of the  team's inaugural squad for the 2016 season.

In August 2021 it was announced that Barnes would be leaving  for the new , due to commence competing from 2022.

Major results
Source:

2008
 1st Blackpool Grand Prix Des Dames
2009
 1st London Nocturne
 1st Leicestershire cyclo-cross
 2nd Madison, National Track Championships (with Corrine Hall)
2010
 1st  National Criterium Championships
 1st  Madison, National Track Championships (with Hannah Walker)
 National Junior Track Championships
1st  Scratch
2nd Individual pursuit
3rd Sprint
 1st  Junior race, National Cyclo-cross Championships
 1st London Nocturne
 1st Twickenham CC Ladies Race
 1st Dumfries BikeFest Women's Criterium
 1st Stratford-upon-Avon Team Series
 1st Oakley Team Series
 1st City of Preston Circuit Races
2011
 1st  National Criterium Championships
 National Junior Track Championships
1st  Scratch
1st  Points race
 Commonwealth Youth Games
1st  Criterium
1st  Time trial
1st  Team road race (with Lucy Garner & Harriet Owen)
3rd  Road race
 1st London Nocturne
 1st CDNW Women's Road Race
 1st Jersey Road Race
 1st Peterborough Johnsons Healthtech Tour Series
 1st City of Preston Circuit Races
 National Track Championships
2nd Team pursuit (with Lucy Garner & Harriet Owen)
2nd Madison (with Hannah Walker)
3rd Individual pursuit
2012
 1st London Nocturne
 1st Stage 3 Essex Giro
 3rd Madison, National Track Championships (with Eileen Roe)
2013
 1st  National Criterium Championships
 1st London Nocturne
 1st  Overall Johnsons Healthtech Tour Series
1st  Sprint classification
1st Woking
1st Redditch
1st Colchester
 1st Eagle RC Good Friday Circuit Race
 1st Curlew Cup Road Race, British National Series
 1st Oakley Team Series
 1st Ryedale GP
 2nd Overall City of Perth Grand Prix
1st Stage 3
2014
 1st Blue Dome Criterium
 1st Brady Arts District Criterium
 1st Charlotte Criterium
 1st Gateway Cup
 1st Stage 1 Tour Femenino de San Luis
 8th Overall The Women's Tour
 9th Winston-Salem Cycling Classic
2015
 1st Gran Prix San Luis Femenino
 1st Sunny King Criterium
 1st Charlotte Criterium
 1st Novant Health Invitational Criterium
 Tour Femenino de San Luis
1st  Young rider classification
1st Stages 1 & 2
 1st  Young rider classification Tour of California
 1st Stage 4 Tour of the Gila
 5th Overall The Women's Tour
1st  British rider classification
1st  Young rider classification
1st Stage 5
2016
 1st  Road race, National Road Championships
 2nd  Team time trial, UCI Road World Championships
 6th Crescent Vårgårda
 9th Prudential RideLondon Grand Prix
2017
 1st Stage 3 Giro d'Italia Femminile
 National Road Championships
2nd Time trial
3rd Road race
 3rd Overall The Women's Tour
1st  British rider classification
 3rd Crescent Vårgårda TTT
 5th Women's Tour de Yorkshire
 7th Le Samyn
 9th Time trial, UCI Road World Championships
2018
 1st  Team time trial, UCI Road World Championships
 1st  Time trial, National Road Championships
 1st  Overall Setmana Ciclista Valenciana
1st Stages 1 & 4
 2nd Tour of Guangxi
 6th Gent–Wevelgem
2019
 1st Stage 1 (TTT) Giro Rosa
 2nd Postnord UCI WWT Vårgårda West Sweden TTT
 3rd Time trial, National Road Championships
 8th Overall Women's Tour de Yorkshire
2020
 6th Liège–Bastogne–Liège
 9th La Périgord Ladies
2021
 5th Omloop Het Nieuwsblad

Personal life 
Barnes is in a relationship with fellow professional cyclist, Sam Bewley.

References

External links

 
 
 
 
 
 
 

1993 births
Living people
English female cyclists
People from Royal Tunbridge Wells
Cyclists at the 2014 Commonwealth Games
Commonwealth Games competitors for England
British cycling road race champions